The Common Reader may refer to:
 A Common Reader, a mail order catalogue
 The Common Reader, two essay collections by Virginia Woolf